Alvim may refer to:

People with the surname
Álvaro Alvim (1863-1928), Brazilian physician, radiologist, medical physicist and radiotherapist
Beatriz Pereira Alvim (1380-1414), Portuguese, daughter of Nuno Álvares Pereira and first Duchess of Braganza
Cesário Alvim (1839-1903), Brazilian mayor of the Distrito Federal of Rio de Janeiro
Diogo António José Leite Pereira de Melo e Alvim, Portuguese colonial Governor of Portuguese Guinea (Guinea-Bissau)
José Cesário de Faria Alvim (1839-1903), Brazilian Governor of Minas Gerais
José J. de Sá Freire Alvim (1909-1981), Brazilian mayor of the Distrito Federal of Rio de Janeiro
Paulo de Tarso Alvim (1919-2011), Brazilian recipient of the Order of Scientific Merit in Biology

Other uses
Alvim, Sarpsborg, Norway

See also
Artur Alvim, a district in the subprefecture of Penha, São Paulo, Brazil
Artur Alvim (São Paulo Metro), São Paulo metro station, Brazil

Portuguese-language surnames